Jubilee Hills Assembly constituency is a constituency of Telangana Legislative Assembly, India. It is one of 15 constituencies in Capital city of Hyderabad.It is part of Secunderabad Lok Sabha constituency.

Maganti Gopinath of TRS is representing the constituency.

Extent of the constituency 
The Assembly Constituency presently comprises the following neighbourhoods:

Members of Legislative Assembly

Election results

Telangana Legislative Assembly election, 2018

Telangana Legislative Assembly election, 2014

Andhra Pradesh Legislative Assembly election, 2009

See also
 List of constituencies of Telangana Legislative Assembly

References

Assembly constituencies of Telangana